The Sauer Valley Bridge is a motorway (Autobahn) bridge high above the Sauer River which at this point marks the frontier between Luxembourg and Germany. It was constructed between 1984 and 1987.

Additionally, the road surface has a constant 1% gradient. The girder bridge was built with a single superstructure for both carriage ways, and is positioned approximately a kilometer to the north of Wasserbillig in Luxembourg.

Superstructure
The bridge has a steel superstructure of a constant level underpinned by a continuous support.

The lateral profile of the bridge deck comprises a single box section  and an Orthotropic deck inclined at 3.8%.

Construction
Construction of the superstructure took place in 68 section. Each section was delivered as eight segments. The steel of the superstructure used the incremental launch method, employing a machine using 21 pushing devices.

References

Further reading 
 Ernst-Günther Nieschalk: Fertigung der Querträger für die Sauertalbrücke. In: Stahlbau 12, Jahrgang 1986, P. 353–355.
 Walter Klein: Montage der Sauertalbrücke im Taktschiebeverfahren. In: Stahlbau 12, Jahrgang 1986, P. 356–360.

Steel bridges
Girder bridges
Bridges in Luxembourg
Road bridges in Germany
Mertert
International bridges
International bridges in Germany
Infrastructure completed in 1987